Krajeńska may refer to the following places in Poland:

Kozia Góra Krajeńska
Krępa Krajeńska
Wysoka Krajeńska